The Oceania Netball Federation is the regional body within the International Federation of Netball Associations that governs netball across Oceania. The current president is Wainikiti Bogidrau from Fiji. There are currently twenty four countries within the Oceania region. There are seven full members with New Zealand the only one with elite status.  Realistically only thirteen nations, predominantly Commonwealth nations, play the game.  

Competitions in the region include the Pacific Netball Series, Pacific Games, Pacific Mini Games and the Arafura Games.

Full Members

Associate members

Other netball nations

References

Netball Oceania member list

  
Oceania